Mohamed Hassan Tita was a member of the Egyptian Islamic Jihad who was living in Albania. He was one of 14 people subjected to extraordinary rendition by the CIA prior to the 2001 declaration of a War on Terror.

He was ostensibly linked to the 1995 plot to blow up the Khan el-Khalili market, as well as the assassination of Speaker of Parliament Rifaat el-Mahgoub in October 1990.

Together with the other three Returnees brought from Tirana, his capture and torture were listed as the main reasons for the 1998 United States embassy bombings.

References

Egyptian torture victims